Kesbewa Divisional Secretariat is a  Divisional Secretariat  of Colombo District, of Western Province, Sri Lanka.

List of divisions
Mampe East Grama Niladhari Division
Mampe West Grama Niladhari Division
Vishwakalawa Grama Niladhari Division

References
 Divisional Secretariats Portal

Divisional Secretariats of Colombo District